Mirić is a Serbo-Croatian surname, derived from mir ("peace"). Notable people with the surname include:

Marko Mirić (born 1987), Serbian footballer
Milan Mirić (writer) (born 1931), Croatian writer
Mitar Mirić (born 1957), Bosnian Serb singer
Voja Mirić (born 1933), Serbian actor

Serbian surnames